Kupreanof (Lingít: Aansadaak’w) is a city at the eastern shore of Kupreanof Island in the Petersburg Borough, in the U.S. state of Alaska. The population was 21 as of the 2020 census, down from 27 in 2010. It is the smallest incorporated city in the state as of 2020.

History
Among the incorporators of Kupreanof were former longtime and much beloved Petersburg Grade School Principal Harold Bergman.  Kupreanof was once called West Petersburg and was a thriving community of fur farms and commercial fishermen in the early- to mid-20th century. Gradually most residents moved over to the larger, more metropolitan city of Petersburg.

Kupreanof remained a separate municipality when the Petersburg Borough incorporated, unlike the neighboring city of Petersburg. However, Kupreanof now lies inside the Petersburg Borough, whereas before, it was a home-rule city inside the unorganized Petersburg Census Area.

Robert "Bobby" Dolan was mayor of Kupreanof for over 40 years.

Geography
Kupreanof is located at  (56.822384, -132.982506). It is across the Wrangell Narrows from Petersburg on Mitkof Island.

Demographics

Kupreanof first appeared on the 1930 U.S. Census as the unincorporated village of West Petersburg, appearing under that name until the 1970 census. It formally changed its name to Kupreanof and incorporated as a city in 1975.

As of the census of 2000, there were 23 people, 12 households, and 6 families residing in the city. The population density was 5.7 people per square mile (2.2/km2). There were 26 housing units at an average density of 6.5 per square mile (2.5/km2). The racial makeup of the city was 91.30% White, 4.35% Asian, and 4.35% from two or more races.

There were 12 households, out of which 16.7% had children under the age of 18 living with them, 50.0% were married couples living together, and 50.0% were non-families. 50.0% of all households were made up of individuals, and 16.7% had someone living alone who was 65 years of age or older. The average household size was 1.92 and the average family size was 2.83.

In the city population was spread out, with 17.4% under the age of 18, 4.3% from 18 to 24, 21.7% from 25 to 44, 47.8% from 45 to 64, and 8.7% who were 65 years of age or older. The median age was 46 years. For every 100 females, there were 91.7 males. For every 100 females age 18 and over, there were 111.1 males.

The median income for a household in the city was $45,833, and the median income for a family was $100,470. Males had a median income of $51,250 versus $0 for females. The per capita income for the city was $26,650. None of the population and none of the families were below the poverty line.

References

Cities in Petersburg Borough, Alaska
Populated coastal places in Alaska on the Pacific Ocean
Cities in Alaska